Bidston Pass or Volunteershoek Pass is a scenic, but very steep and gravel, route situated in the Eastern Cape, South Africa.

Geography 
The pass is situated near Tiffindell Ski Resort. Bidstone pass is 3.9 km long and rises from 1917m to 2382m.

References

Mountain passes of the Eastern Cape